Church of Saints Cyril and Methodius is a Roman Catholic church in the Karlín district of Prague, Czech Republic. It belongs to the largest religious buildings in the Czech Republic. It was constructed in the mid-19th century and it remains one of the most important architectural landmarks from the period of historicism in the country.

The church was built in 1854–1863 to plans by architects Carl Roesner and Vojtěch Ignác Ullmann. Several Czech and Austrian artists contributed to the decoration of the church, led by František Sequens and Josef Mathias Trenkwald. The Church was consecrated on 18 October 1863, on the millennium anniversary of the arrival of Saints Cyril and Methodius to the Bohemian lands.

The church has been constructed in the late Neo-Romanesque style as a basilica with highly elevated main nave and two towers. The ground plan contents an entrance hall, three naves and a presbytery with a semicircular apse between two chapels under the towers. The last decoration of baptismal chapel was finished in 1905 in an art nouveau style.

References 
 
 Karlín. Chrám sv. Cyrila a Metoděje v Praze-Karlíně. Photos by Martin Frouz. Kostelní Vydří: Karmelitánské nakladatelství, 2007. 216 s. . (the book was awarded the prize for the best Czech book illustrations of the year).

External links 
 Official website of the parish 

Churches in Prague 8
19th-century Roman Catholic church buildings in the Czech Republic
Roman Catholic churches completed in 1863